John Ernest Emburey (born 20 August 1952) is a former English first-class cricketer who played for Middlesex, Northamptonshire, Western Province, Berkshire and England.

According to cricket writer Colin Bateman, Emburey's participation in two South African rebel tours "cost him six lost years as far as Test cricket was concerned... and, more significantly, probably an extended run as England captain, a job for which he was better suited than some who held the position post-Mike Brearley".

Playing career
Emburey was a right arm spin bowler and a slightly eccentric but useful lower-order batsman with the style of a grafter. He was more notable as an economical performer than a "demon" spin bowler, but on his day could leave the best batsmen groping outside off-stump. One of his dangerous balls was his arm ball outswinger. Emburey was named a Wisden Cricketer of the Year in 1984.

Emburey played an understated but significant role in England's storied victory in the Ashes in 1981, notably in the important fourth Test at Edgbaston, where he contributed runs and wickets as England took the lead in the series for the first time. According to the Wisden report on the match, while Ian Botham "was again named Man of the Match ... Emburey would have been the choice of many". In all Emburey featured in four Ashes series won by England, in 1978–9, 1981, 1985, and 1986-7 (as well as in two defeats in  1989 and 1993). He also played for England (on the losing side) in the 1987 Cricket world cup final.

Emburey was briefly made England Test captain in 1988, the notorious "Summer of four captains". Mike Gatting was sacked after the first Test match against the West Indies and Emburey was appointed for two matches, both of which were lost. Emburey too was fired and was replaced by Chris Cowdrey for the fourth Test. Cowdrey lasted just one match, replaced in turn by Graham Gooch. While not a successful Test captain, Emburey had some successes captaining England in one-day international cricket, leading them to victory (in the absence of Gatting and Botham) in the Sharjah Cup in 1986–7.

Emburey was the only cricketer to go on both the England rebel tours to South Africa in 1981/2 and 1989/90; the rebels were banned from Test matches  because of the apartheid régime, although it both cases Emburey was eventually restored to the England test team (respectively in 1985 and 1993). Emburey said of his decision to join the second rebel tour: "In hindsight it was a mistake. But at the time my decision was purely monetary. I'd lost my benefit money in a building society in Australia." According to Graham Gooch's published tour diary, Emburey had dressed up as a member of the Ku Klux Klan at a fancy dress party on tour just before the news of the first rebel tour broke.

Later in his Test career, Emburey tended to be picked for single Tests in England, as happened in 1993 against Australia, when statistically, he was the leading all rounder in the country, and 1995 against the West Indies. Broadly from 1987 his bowling was less effective in test cricket, although his batting became more successful; from February 1987 his Test wickets averaged almost twice as much as they had before.

At county level, Emburey's Middlesex career coincided with that of Phil Edmonds. The right and left arm spin combination was a powerful contribution towards Middlesex's successes in the 1980s. They also combined at England level, although the pair also sometimes competed for the same place in the Test team. A highlight of Emburey's Middlesex career was taking 12 wickets in a single day in a championship match at Lord's in 1980. He scored the winning runs from the last ball as Middlesex won the final of the NatWest Bank Trophy in 1984, and was man of the match when Middlesex won the Benson & Hedges Cup final in 1986 (in both cases defeating Kent). Between 1977 and 1993, the County won the County Championship outright five times, with one shared title in 1977.

Emburey holds the dubious distinction of being the highest England Test run-scorer never to have made a Test century. Emburey held the batting record for the highest innings made entirely from boundaries. Despite his chronic lack of footwork, he scored 46 for the England XI against Tasmania at Hobart in 1986–87, with ten fours and a six.

Whilst not the most agile in the field, he seldom dropped anything, pulling off many a stunning catch, often at gully, and had an excellent arm in the deep.

Coaching and other activities
Emburey coached the England A cricket team to a 3–0 win in India in 1995, and was considered for the position of manager for the senior side, but lost out to David Lloyd (whom he assisted for two test series in the West Indies and Zimbabwe). He subsequently coached Northamptonshire County Cricket Club from 1996 but was sacked in 1998 after a string of poor results. In 2001, he became coach for Middlesex County Cricket Club, but was sacked in 2008. In 2007, after Greg Chappell left his position as India head coach, Emburey was shortlisted for the job, but declined it. In February 2008, he signed on as the coach of the Ahmedabad Rockets, one of the expansion teams in the second season of the Indian Cricket League. As of May 2018, he works as a scout for the England and Wales Cricket Board.

Personal life
Politically, Emburey is a Conservative, and once appeared on stage at a Conservative Party conference in the 1980s alongside England teammate Bill Athey.

In May 2014, he stated that he had skin cancer, attributing it to playing cricket without sunscreen or a hat.

He is married, with a wife and two daughters.

References

External links

 

1952 births
Living people
English cricket coaches
Middlesex cricket coaches
Presidents of Middlesex County Cricket Club
England One Day International cricketers
England Test cricketers
English cricketers of 1969 to 2000
England Test cricket captains
Berkshire cricketers
English cricketers
Marylebone Cricket Club cricketers
Middlesex cricketers
Northamptonshire cricketers
Western Province cricketers
Wisden Cricketers of the Year
People from Peckham
Indian Cricket League coaches
Cricketers at the 1987 Cricket World Cup
Test and County Cricket Board XI cricketers
D. B. Close's XI cricketers
D. H. Robins' XI cricketers
Young England cricketers